Cloyne Round Tower is a round tower in the historically monastic town of Cloyne, County Cork in Ireland. Cloyne was also the "see city" of the Anglican (Church of Ireland) Diocese of Cork, Cloyne and Ross. The tower is a symbol for the town of Cloyne.

History
The monastic settlement at Cloyne dates to about 560 AD, when Saint Colman mac Lenene (who died in 604) founded the original monastery. The round tower itself dates to around the 10th century, and is approximately 30m high and 16.25m around when measured about 1.5m above the ground. The stone in the tower is dark purple sandstone. As with some other round towers, a lightning strike caused some damage to the top of the tower. The strike was in 1749. 
There is also the ruin of a Norman watchtower on a hill overlooking the town.

The town has a cathedral from its time as a religious centre, as well as a more recent church. The Church of Ireland Cathedral dates to 1250 A.D. The local Catholic church, St. Colmans, was built in 1815. The round tower was used to hang the Cathedral bell in the 19th century.

Further reading
 
 
 Cork City Library - Cork Past and Present project - Including images of the tower

References

National Monuments in County Cork
Religion in County Cork
Towers in the Republic of Ireland